Live in Philadelphia may refer to:

 Live in Philadelphia (Yes video), a video by Yes
 Live in Philadelphia, PA, an album by King Crimson
 Live in Philadelphia '70 an album by The Doors
 Live in Philadelphia Dec. 1997, an album by Atari Teenage Riot